Russky Lem is a rural locality (a village) in Petropavlovskoye Rural Settlement, Bolshesosnovsky District, Perm Krai, Russia. The population was 6 as of 2010. There is 1 street.

Geography 
It is located on the Lem River.

References 

Rural localities in Bolshesosnovsky District